WBGO (88.3 FM, "Jazz 88") is a public radio station licensed to Newark, New Jersey. Studios and offices are located on Park Place in downtown Newark, and its transmitter is located at 4 Times Square in Manhattan. The station primarily plays jazz music.  In addition the station airs public affairs programming, locally produced newscasts, traffic reports from Total Traffic during morning and afternoon rush hours, and NPR-produced newscasts and programming.

History
WBGO's first license was granted on January 26, 1947.  Originally owned by the Newark Board of Education with studios in Central High School, it was established as the first public radio station in New Jersey when in 1979 the broadcast license was transferred to Newark Public Radio in cooperation with the Corporation for Public Broadcasting.  WBGO then became affiliated with National Public Radio (NPR) and went to a 24-hour broadcast format in 1980.

While WBGO's base of operations remain in Newark, the station's broadcast antenna and transmission system moved to Midtown Manhattan on December 30, 2011.

WBGO was one of two major FM jazz stations in the New York City metropolitan area, along with smooth jazz station WQCD until 2008, when that station flipped to a rock format, leaving WBGO as the New York area's only jazz station.

See also
 List of jazz radio stations in the United States

References

External links
 

Newark jazz
Culture of Newark, New Jersey
Jazz radio stations in the United States
NPR member stations
BGO
Radio stations established in 1948
Companies based in Newark, New Jersey
Mass media in Newark, New Jersey